Sideroxylon socorrense is a plant species in the family Sapotaceae. It is endemic to Mexico, occurring only on Socorro in the Revillagigedo Islands.

On its island home, this small tree grows in habitat that is at least seasonally humid. This restricts it mainly to a belt of woodland between 650 and 900 m above mean sea level, except on the northern side where wetter conditions predominate. It is classified as Vulnerable by the IUCN due to the adverse effects of introduced sheep grazing and the twice-yearly swarming of the locust Schistocerca piceifrons, a non-native pest that has become established on Socorro more recently.

The fruits of this plant are among the favorite foods of the nearly-extinct Socorro mockingbird (Mimus graysoni) and the Socorro dove (Zenaida graysoni) which presently only survives in captivity. Similar as in other Sideroxylon, these birds might be crucial for the present species' reproduction.

Footnotes

References
 
 BirdLife International (BLI) (2007b): Socorro Dove – BirdLife Species Factsheet. Retrieved 2007-NOV-24.
 
 California/Mexico Island Conservation Database (CMICD) (2007): Plant accounts: Socorro. Retrieved 2007-NOV-13.
 

socorrense
Endemic flora of Mexico
Trees of Colima
Trees of Mexican Pacific Islands
Vulnerable plants
Taxonomy articles created by Polbot